The Albert Einstein Society was founded by Dr. Max Flückiger on 28 June 1977. Based in Bern, Switzerland, the society awards the Einstein Medal
to individuals who have made an outstanding contribution to science that relates to the work of Albert Einstein.

References

External links 
Einstein Haus Bern

Organizations established in 1977
Scientific societies based in Switzerland
Organisations based in Bern
1977 establishments in Switzerland
Albert Einstein